The 1929 Boston University Pioneers football team was an American football team that represented Boston University as an independent during the 1929 college football season. In its fourth and final season under head coach Reggie Brown & Edward N. Robinson, the team compiled a 3–6 record and was outscored by a total of 187 to 103.

Schedule

References

Boston University
Boston University Terriers football seasons
Boston University football